Austria competed at the 1960 Summer Olympics in Rome, Italy. 103 competitors, 82 men and 21 women, took part in 81 events in 15 sports.

Medalists

Athletics

Boxing

Canoeing

Cycling

Eight male cyclists represented Austria in 1960.

Individual road race
 Arnold Ruiner
 Kurt Postl
 Fritz Inthaler
 Kurt Schweiger

Team time trial
 Peter Deimböck
 Fritz Inthaler
 Kurt Postl
 Kurt Schweiger

1000m time trial
 Günther Kriz

Team pursuit
 Günther Kriz
 Peter Deimböck
 Kurt Garschal
 Kurt Schein

Diving

Equestrian

Fencing

Nine fencers, five men and four women, represented Austria in 1960.

Men's sabre
 Helmuth Resch
 Günther Ulrich
 Josef Wanetschek

Men's team sabre
 Helmuth Resch, Paul Kerb, Hans Hocke, Günther Ulrich, Josef Wanetschek

Women's foil
 Traudl Ebert
 Maria Grötzer
 Helga Gnauer

Women's team foil
 Helga Gnauer, Traudl Ebert, Waltraut Peck-Repa, Maria Grötzer

Gymnastics

Modern pentathlon

Three male pentathlete represented Austria in 1960.

Individual
 Peter Lichtner-Hoyer
 Udo Birnbaum
 Frank Battig

Team
 Peter Lichtner-Hoyer
 Udo Birnbaum
 Frank Battig

Rowing

Austria had 10 male rowers participate in four out of seven rowing events in 1960.

 Men's single sculls
 Horst Fink

 Men's double sculls
 Gottfried Dittrich
 Adolf Löblich

 Men's coxless pair
 Alfred Sageder
 Josef Kloimstein

 Men's coxed four
 Dieter Ebner
 Helmuth Kuttelwascher
 Horst Kuttelwascher
 Dieter Losert
 Wolfdietrich Traugott (cox)

Sailing

Open

Shooting

Five shooters represented Austria in 1960. Hubert Hammerer won gold in the 300 m rifle, three positions event.
Men

Swimming

Weightlifting

Wrestling

References

External links
Official Olympic Reports
International Olympic Committee results database

Nations at the 1960 Summer Olympics
1960
Summer Olympics